Evangelina Yolanda Salazar (born June 15, 1946) is an Argentine actress.

Career 
On television she had started in 1962 with Marilina Ross and Teresa Blasco in the cast of the cycle  Señoritas alumnas of Abel Santa Cruz. She also participated in teleteachers such as El amor tiene cara de mujer of Nené Cascallar, gaining great popularity as the teacher Jacinta Pichimahuida in the mid-60s and La pícara soñadora in 1968. In 1970 she was María de los Remedios de Escalada in the movie El Santo de la Espada by Leopoldo Torre Nilsson with Alfredo Alcón, Lautaro Murúa and Héctor Alterio, on the script of Beatriz Guido and Ulises Petit de Murat. In 2001 she made a brief participation in the youth television series EnAmorArte which was starring Emanuel Ortega and produced by Sebastián Ortega. In 2004 she reappeared in the film Monobloc directed by her son Luis Ortega, winning the Silver Condor Award as a Supporting Actress. 
In 2011 she returned to television in the comedy Un año para recordar, broadcast by Telefe, she was the storyteller. This series was produced by her son Sebastián Ortega. In 2012 she made a special participation in the most successful comedy of the year, Graduados broadcast by Telefe. There she played a justice of the peace who married the characters of Guillermo (Juan Gil Navarro) and Fernando (Ivo Cutzarida). This fiction was also produced by her son Sebastián Ortega.

Personal life 
In 1967 she married the singer Palito Ortega and they had six children, Martín Ortega, Julieta Ortega, Sebastián Ortega, Emanuel Ortega, Luis Ortega and Rosario Ortega.

Filmography

Movies

Television

Awards and nominations

References

External links

20th-century Argentine actresses
Ortega family (Argentina)
Actresses from Buenos Aires
1946 births
Living people
21st-century Argentine actresses
Argentine film actresses